Nigel Mansell's World Championship Racing is an arcade-style Formula One racing video game developed by Gremlin Graphics and released for various systems. The game was largely successful on Amiga and DOS platforms, and was consequently ported to home consoles.

Gameplay

The player can race a single race, participate in a season of Formula One, or practice their skills on a particular race track. The changing of the tyres is mandatory in the pit lane during the middle of each race, and weather can determine whether the player should use hard tyres, soft tyres, or rain tyres. Before the beginning of the race, it is possible to change some aspects of the car, such as spoilers, tyres and gearbox.

Being licensed by Nigel Mansell, the game followed the 1992 Formula One season, which he won. The player takes on Mansell's role to try to win the title against eleven other real-life drivers that were still active in their careers by the time the game was launched. Like Sega's own Super Monaco GP, each of them belongs to their own team (instead of the common F1 format of two drivers per constructor).

Although all the rival cars' colors resemble the actual constructors' colors by that time, only Mansell character wears a suit in the same color of his team's — blue. Mansell is also the only character to have his own sprite, distinguished by his signature mustache and cap. All the other drivers are shown with a similar sprite, all of them in yellow racing suits.

The player also has the option to change Mansell character by setting a different name and nationality. The countries available on custom mode are South Africa, Mexico, Brazil, Spain, Finland, Monaco, Canada, France, the United Kingdom, Germany, Hungary, Belgium, Italy, Portugal, Japan, Australia, Austria, and the United States. However, the playable character's appearance will remain that of Mansell. The game also features the national anthem for each of these countries, played in the podium whenever the player character wins a race. If a rival wins the race but the player finishes as runner-up or third place, the podium will still be shown, but the anthem to be played will be the one of the winning driver's home country. The rivals cannot be customized.

The 12 drivers and 16 circuits

Drivers
 Nigel Mansell (Williams-Renault) (player character)
 Gerhard Berger (McLaren-Honda) (replaced by  Ayrton Senna in the Super Famicom version)
 Michael Schumacher (Benetton) (replaced by  Martin Brundle in the Amiga version)
 Mika Häkkinen (Lotus) (replaced by  Johnny Herbert in the Amiga version)
 Jean Alesi (Ferrari)
 Andrea de Cesaris (Tyrrell)
 Aguri Suzuki (Footwork)
 Érik Comas (Ligier)
 Pierluigi Martini (Dallara)
 Ukyo Katayama (Venturi Larrousse)
 Stefano Modena (Jordan)
 Karl Wendlinger (March)
 Eric van de Poele (Fondmetal) (Amiga version exclusive, replacing Wendlinger in the March)

Circuits
 Kyalami
 Hermanos Rodríguez
 Interlagos
 Catalunya
 Imola
 Monaco
 Circuit Gilles Villeneuve
 Magny-Cours
 Silverstone
 Hockenheimring
 Hungaroring
 Spa-Francorchamps
 Monza
 Estoril
 Suzuka
 Adelaide

Ports
A port of the game was in development by Gremlin Graphics for the Atari Jaguar after they were signed to be a third-party developer by Atari Corporation for the system in November 1993 and was slated for a Q2 1995 release, however, this version was never released for unknown reasons. A Commodore 64 version was also in development, and was said to be looking promising, but was cancelled as it was taking too long.

Reception

Rating the game 1.5 stars out of five, Computer Gaming World in August 1994 said that despite the product endorsement, Nigel Mansell "is at best a mediocre attempt at a racing simulation" that should have been released five years earlier. The magazine recommended Lotus III: The Ultimate Challenge for arcade racing and World Circuit as a racing simulation.

See also
 Newman/Haas IndyCar featuring Nigel Mansell

Notes

References

External links 
 Nigel Mansell's World Championship Racing at GameFAQs
 Nigel Mansell's World Championship Racing at Giant Bomb
 Nigel Mansell's World Championship Racing at MobyGames

1992 video games
Racing video games
Amiga games
Amstrad CPC games
Atari ST games
Cancelled Atari Jaguar games
Amiga CD32 games
Mansell
Mansell
Formula One video games
Game Boy games
GameTek games
Gremlin Interactive games
Konami games
Nintendo Entertainment System games
Sega Genesis games
Super Nintendo Entertainment System games
Video games based on real people
Video games scored by Patrick Phelan
Video games set in 1992
ZX Spectrum games
Video games developed in the United Kingdom